Brentwood Union School District is a public school district based in Contra Costa County, California. The district operates eight elementary schools and three middle schools in Brentwood. It operates Brentwood Elementary School, Garin Elementary School, Krey Elementary School, Loma Vista Elementary School, Marsh Creek Elementary School, Mary Casey Black Elementary School, Pioneer Elementary School, and Ron Nunn Elementary School. The three middle schools are Edna Hill, Adams (J. Douglas Adams), and Bristow (William B. Bristow).

References

External links
 

School districts in Contra Costa County, California